Iran Post is the government-owned and operated corporation responsible for providing postal services in Iran. Iran Post transports about 700 thousand parcels a day and connects some 29,000 destinations while it employs more than 16,000 people.

According to Iranian government sources in 2015, the highest volume of outgoing mail it handles goes to the United States and the largest amount of incoming mail arrives from Germany, China and England.

As of 2015, Iran Post had plans for cooperation with Germany's logistics firm DHL and Dutch package delivery firm TNT Express.

See also

Transport in Iran

References

External links 
 (English language version)

Express mail
Postal organizations
Postal system of Iran
Philately of Iran